David Norman may refer to:
David Norman (Australian footballer) (born 1942), former Australian rules footballer
David Norman (ornithologist) (born 1950), British physicist and ornithologist
David Norman (soccer) (born 1962), Canadian soccer player
David Norman Jr. (born 1998), Canadian soccer player, son of David Norman born 1962
David B. Norman (born 1952), British palaeontologist
David Norman (cricketer) (born 1968), former English cricketer
David Luke Norman (1924–1995), American attorney and judge